Meadia is a genus of eels in the cutthroat eel family Synaphobranchidae. It currently contains the following species:

 Meadia abyssalis (Kamohara, 1938) (Abyssal cutthroat eel)
 Meadia roseni H. K. Mok, C. Y. Lee & H. J. Chan, 1991
 Meadia minor V.-Q. Vo & H.-C. Ho, 2021 (Small cutthroat eel)

References

 

Synaphobranchidae
Taxa named by James Erwin Böhlke